Dan Geer is a computer security analyst and risk management specialist. He is recognized for raising awareness of critical computer and network security issues before the risks were widely understood, and for ground-breaking work on the economics of security.

Geer is currently the chief information security officer for In-Q-Tel, a not-for-profit venture capital firm that invests in technology to support the Central Intelligence Agency.

In 2003, Geer's 24-page report entitled "CyberInsecurity: The Cost of Monopoly" was released by the Computer and Communications Industry Association (CCIA). The paper argued that Microsoft's dominance of desktop computer operating systems is a threat to national security. Geer was fired (from consultancy @Stake) the day the report was made public. Geer has cited subsequent changes in the Vista operating system (notably a location-randomization feature) as evidence that Microsoft "accepted the paper."

Geer received a Bachelor of Science in Electrical Engineering and Computer Science from MIT, where he was a member of the Theta Deuteron charge of Theta Delta Chi fraternity.  He also received a Sc.D. in biostatistics from Harvard, and has worked for:

 Health Sciences Computing Facility, Harvard School of Public Health
 Project Athena, MIT
 Digital Equipment Corporation
 Geer Zolot & Associates
 OpenVision Technologies
 Open Market
 Certco
 @stake (acquired by Symantec in November 2004)
 Verdasys

In 2011, Geer received the USENIX Lifetime Achievement Award.

References

External links 

 Dan Geer's home publications page
 All Geered Up: An Interview With Dan Geer By Richard Thieme
 Letter to Massachusetts Senator Marc Pacheco on OpenDocument Standards by Dan Geer
 Oh Dan Geer, where art thou? by Ellen Messmer
 Security of Information When Economics Matters by Dan Geer (PDF format)
 The Shrinking Perimeter: Making the Case for Data-Level Risk Management by Dan Geer (PDF format)
 Dan Geer's Convergence Time based security and the convergence of both digital and physical security (PDF format)
  Dan Geer's April 23, 2007 Testimony to Subcommittee on Emerging Threats, Cybersecurity, and Science and Technology (PDF Format)
 Geer's nomination to the FTC Advisory Committee
 Geer's keynote speech at Black Hat USA 2014: Cybersecurity as Realpolitik; video of Geer's keynote

MIT School of Engineering alumni
Harvard School of Public Health alumni
Chief security officers
Year of birth missing (living people)
Living people
Harvard University staff